Loipersdorf-Kitzladen is a town in the district of Oberwart in the Austrian state of Burgenland.

Population

References

Cities and towns in Oberwart District